Aleksandr Nikolayevich Postnikov-Streltsov (born 23 February 1957)  is the former commander-in-chief of the Russian Ground Forces (2010–2012). He currently holds the rank of Colonel General.

He was the Commander of the Siberian Military District since 2007. Previously, he held the positions of Chief of Staff and First Deputy Commander of the Siberian Military District (from 2006-2007), Chief of Staff and First Deputy Commander of the North Caucasus Military District (2004-2006), and Commander of the 20th Guards Army, Moscow Military District, (2002-2004).

References

External links 
  - General Mark Hertling's interactions with Postnikov

Russian colonel generals
1957 births
Living people
Frunze Military Academy alumni
Military Academy of the General Staff of the Armed Forces of Russia alumni